Let Us Begin may refer to:

"Let's Begin", 1933 song by Jerome Kern
Let's Begin, EP by Clare Maguire
"Let Us Begin", song by John Denver from album One World
"Let Us Begin", song by Snoop Dogg from album Neva Left